Way Down South is the debut solo album of Matt "Guitar" Murphy, first released in 1990 with Discovery. It includes contributions by his brother Floyd.

Track listing

Reception

The record is listed as an "Album Pick" on AllMusic. Reviewing for the site, Bill Dahl commented the guitarist "acquits himself most competently here, mixing blues, funk, R&B, and a little jazz into his sparkling fretwork. His brother Floyd Murphy, a Memphis blues guitar legend himself, is on hand for a family reunion."

Personnel
 Matt "Guitar" Murphycomposer, guitar, primary artist, producer, vocals
 Mark "Kaz" Kazanoffsaxophone
 Derek O'Brienguitar (rhythm)
 Floyd Murphyguitar, drums, composer
 Mel Brownpiano
 Eugene Carrierorgan, piano
 Chester Kingharmonica
 Russell Jacksonbass
 Tony Colemandrums
 Donna Pearlvocals (background)
 Angela Strehliguest artist, vocals (background)

Support
 Mark Guerraphotography
 Malcolm Harperediting
 Bill Narumart direction
 Derek O'Brienassistant producer, engineer, mixing, production assistant
 Jim O'Nealliner notes
 Stuart Sullivanengineer
 James Tuttleengineer, mixing
 Sam Yeatesartwork, illustrations

References

Bibliography

 

1990 debut albums
Discovery Records albums
Matt "Guitar" Murphy albums